Bishop Ceaser Asili Memorial Hospital, also Bishop Asili Hospital, is a community hospital in Uganda. It is owned and operated by the Roman Catholic Diocese of Kasana–Luweero.

Location
The hospital is located in the town of Luweero, in Luweero District, in the Buganda Region of Uganda. The coordinates of the hospital are 0°49'32.0"N, 32°30'04.0"E (Latitude:0.825556; Longitude:32.501111).

Overview
Bishop Ceaser Asili Memorial Hospital, is an urban community hospital, that serves the population of Luweero District. It is the only General Hospital in the district. Due to the good quality of services rendered, many patients travel from other parts of the country to seek services at this facility.

History
The hospital was founded as Bishop Asili Health Centre, named after the late Bishop Cesare Asili (20 September 1924 – 12 October 1988), who served as the Bishop of the Roman Catholic Diocese of Lira from 20 September 1968 until his death, 20 years later. 

In 2006, the clinic was affiliated with the Just Like My Child Foundation (JLMCF), a San Diego-based non-profit, which raised US$30,000 for a diesel generator. Later, a surgical theatre (operating room) was built, an autoclave (sterilizer) and other surgical equipment were procured and a doctor was made available.

Besides attending to the health needs of the community, JLMCF became active in the surrounding villages, building schools and working with families and community leaders to start self-sustaining farming businesses, and holding workshops to teach life-skills and mentor more than 1,300 adolescent girls in 12 villages.

In 2007, the Clinton Foundation gave the Just Like My Child Foundation to provide HIV pediatric testing through Bishop Asili Hospital. As of August 2018, the hospital provided medical and surgical therapeutic care, treatment for HIV/AIDS, prenatal, obstetric and postnatal care, as well as malaria treatment and prevention in nearly 80 neighboring villages.

JLMCF has been able to establish a community health insurance plan, serving over 18,000 individuals.

Bishop Asili Hospital is expanding rapidly. During the twelve months that ended in June 2013, the hospital treated 21,000 patients. One year later, that number doubled to 42,000. The Uganda Ministry health designated the facility as a “hospital” from “clinic”, following the acquisition of a laboratory and refrigeration capabilities for blood storage.

See also
List of hospitals in Uganda

References

External links
 Baby Stolen From Bishop Ceaser Asili Memorial Hospital As of 6 June 2018.

Hospitals established in 2006
Central Region, Uganda
Luweero District
Franciscan hospitals
2006 establishments in Uganda
Catholic hospitals in Africa